Santiago Airport normally refers to:

 Comodoro Arturo Merino Benítez International Airport (SCL), also known as Santiago International Airport, in Santiago de Chile, Chile
 Santiago de Compostela Airport, in Santiago de Compostela, Spain
 Santiago Airport (Brazil), in Santiago, Rio Grande do Sul, Brazil

It may also refer to:

 Antonio Maceo Airport, in Santiago de Cuba, Cuba
 Cibao International Airport, in Santiago de los Caballeros, Dominican Republic
 Del Caribe International General Santiago Marino Airport, in Isla Margarita, Venezuela
 Praia International Airport, on Santiago Island in Cape Verde
 Querétaro International Airport, in Santiago de Querétaro, Mexico
 Ruben Cantu Airport, in Santiago de Veraguas, Panama
 Santiago Airport (Bolivia), in San Ignacio de Moxos, Beni Department, Bolivia
 Santiago del Estero Airport, in Santiago del Estero, Argentina
 Santiago Pérez Quiroz Airport, in Arauca, Colombia